Bon Khunik (also Romanized as Bon Khūnīk and Ban Khūnīk; also known as Band Khūnīk) is a village in Afin Rural District, Zohan District, Zirkuh County, South Khorasan Province, Iran. At the 2006 census, its population was 98, in 30 families.

References 

Populated places in Zirkuh County